Pleurobema hagleri, the brown pigtoe, was a species of freshwater mussel, an aquatic bivalve mollusk in the family Unionidae, the river mussels.

This species was endemic to the United States. Its natural habitat was rivers.

References

Extinct invertebrates since 1500
Molluscs described in 1900
Extinct animals of the United States
hagleri
Taxonomy articles created by Polbot